Women's Super G World Cup 1987/1988

Final point standings

In Women's Super G World Cup 1986/87 all 5 results count.

Women's Super G Team Results

All points were shown. bold indicate highest score - italics indicate race wins

References
 fis-ski.com

External links
 

World Cup
FIS Alpine Ski World Cup women's Super-G discipline titles